Neduvasal is a village in the Ammapettai revenue block, Papanasam taluk, Thanjavur district of Tamil Nadu state, India.

Demographics 
Neduvasal has the population of 1656. Of these 814 are males, while 842 are females. This village has a lower literacy rate of compared to that of the state. According to the 2011 census, Neduvasal has a literacy rate of 71.9%. This village population consists of about 35.87% of Scheduled castes.

References

Villages in Thanjavur district